The Pointe des Plines (3,052 m) is a minor peak on the east edge of the Mont Blanc massif, close to the Aiguille Dorees, and overlooking the Saleina Glacier in the canton of Valais.

A shelter of the Swiss Alpine Club, the Bivouac de l'Envers des Dorées, is located west of the summit.

References

External links
 Pointe des Plines on Hikr

Mountains of the Alps
Alpine three-thousanders
Mountains of Valais
Mountains of Switzerland
Mont Blanc massif